Thomas Renault (born 5 March 1984) is a French former professional footballer who played as a goalkeeper. He spent all of his professional career with his hometown club Orléans.

References

Living people
1984 births
French footballers
Footballers from Orléans
Association football goalkeepers
Ligue 2 players
US Orléans players